Gotthelf Leberecht Glaeser (11 July 1784 in Pegau - 19 May 1851 in Langen) was a German painter of the Biedermeier movement.

Life and works 
His parents were the cantor and teacher in Pegau, Johann Friedrich Gotthelf Glaeser (1755-1814) and his wife Christiane Hübler († 1814).

According to Georg Kaspar Nagler, he was a student of Friedrich August Tischbein in Leipzig, but was also influenced by Anton Graff. In 1812, he became court painter in Darmstadt. From 1820 to 1823 he lived in Frankfurt am Main. During this time or shortly thereafter, some allegorical and religious depictions emerged, which differed from his other works. The first mention of his office as Grand Ducal Hessian court painter dates from 1825. In Darmstadt he was a member of the local Masonic lodge Johannes Evangelist Eintracht.

Glaeser specialized in portraiture. On the early courtly portraits until about 1820, delicate colors dominate. Influences of the 18th century can still be seen here. The decade between 1820 and 1830 was regarded as the culmination of his creative art, in which expressed a soulful realism, according to Heinrich Ragaller. The only self-portrait he received dates back to 1833, when his painting became more fragmented and phased. The later works from the 1840s were perceived as flatter and colder than the earlier ones.

Around 1810, he created a portrait of Christiane Schumann, the mother of the composer Robert Schumann. Also, he portrayed Ludwig Pfister, who was particularly known for the pursuit of the Hölzerlipsbande. Among the well-known figures painted by Glaeser were the Grand Duchess Luise and Prince Christian of Hesse-Darmstadt as well as other members of the court, as well as bourgeois and the publisher August Schumann.

Numerous works of Glaesers are shown in the Darmstadt castle museum as well as in the Hessian national museum, Darmstadt. The Jewish Museum in New York has five pictures of works on which he represented members of the Reiss family. He had some of his works reproduced by lithography.

Glaeserweg is named for him, in Darmstadt-Arheilgen.

References 

1784 births
1851 deaths
People from Pegau
People from the Electorate of Saxony
19th-century German painters
Biedermeier painters
German Freemasons
19th-century German male artists
German male painters